Šmarje is a village in the City Municipality of Koper in the Littoral region of Slovenia.

The parish church in the settlement is dedicated to the Virgin Mary.

References

External links
Šmarje on Geopedia

Populated places in the City Municipality of Koper